The Nazing Court Apartments are an historic site at 224-236 Seaver Street and 1-8 Nazing Court in the Roxbury neighborhood of Boston, Massachusetts. It consists of two large Colonial Revival apartment blocks designed by Boston architect Sumner Schein and built in 1929. One houses 53 units, the other 98; they stand on a parcel overlooking Franklin Park. They were built to provide housing for Roxbury's burgeoning working-class Jewish community, and are a rare residential work of Schein, who did mostly commercial work.

The apartments were listed on the National Register of Historic Places in 2004.

See also
National Register of Historic Places listings in southern Boston, Massachusetts

References

Apartment buildings in Boston
Apartment buildings on the National Register of Historic Places in Massachusetts
Roxbury, Boston
National Register of Historic Places in Boston

Residential buildings completed in 1929